Cleptometopus ochreomaculatus is a species of beetle in the family Cerambycidae.

Cleptometopus ochreomaculatus was described by Breuning in 1982.

References 

ochreomaculatus
Beetles described in 1982